Franklin Wesley "Bud" Held (born October 25, 1927) is an American athlete primarily notable for his performance throwing the javelin. He was born in Los Angeles, California.

College career
Held started as a pole vaulter at Grossmont High School near San Diego, where he finished in a 3-way tie for 4th place at the 1946 CIF California State Meet. He switched to the javelin while a student at Stanford University, where he won the NCAA javelin championship in 1948, 1949, and 1950. Held won the AAU USA Outdoor Track and Field Championships six times, 1949, 1951, 1953 to 55 and 1958.

International competition
Held was a member of the United States' 1952 Olympic team where he placed ninth after a shoulder injury, and missed making the 1956 Olympic team by an inch.

Master's competition
Held continues to compete in masters competitions. On October 4, 2008 at the Club West Masters Track meet in Santa Barbara, Held set the age 80+ World Record in the pole vault adding to the M75 World Record he already holds. He is also ranked in the discus. He also coaches his live-in partner Nadine O'Connor, who holds the women's 65+ pole vault world record, among numerous other track and field records.

Outside of competition
After his retirement from standard competition, Held became a sporting equipment businessman. He founded Ektelon, inventing the world's first aluminum tennis racquet and its related stringing equipment from his San Diego garage, then subsequently the first aluminum racquetball racquet. He also invented a hollow javelin that was used into the 1960s, but his design was later outlawed due to safety concerns.

Honors
Held was inducted into the USA Track & Field Hall of Fame in 1987, the USATF Masters Hall of Fame in 2005 and is a member of the Stanford Athletic Hall of Fame.

References

External links 
 

1927 births
Living people
20th-century American inventors
American male javelin throwers
Pan American Games gold medalists for the United States
Athletes (track and field) at the 1955 Pan American Games
Olympic track and field athletes of the United States
Athletes (track and field) at the 1952 Summer Olympics
Stanford Cardinal men's track and field athletes
American masters athletes
American male pole vaulters
World record holders in masters athletics
World record setters in athletics (track and field)
Track and field athletes from Los Angeles
Pan American Games medalists in athletics (track and field)
Medalists at the 1955 Pan American Games